El Pao is the name of several towns in Venezuela:

 El Pao, Anzoátegui, also known as El Pao de Barcelona, in the state of Anzoátegui, elevation 222m, 
 El Pao, Barinas in the state of Barinas, elevation 40m, 
 El Pao, Cojedes in the state of Cojedes, elevation 132m, 
 El Pao, Monagas in the state of Monagas, elevation 892m, 
 El Pao, Trujillo in the state of Trujillo, elevation 1231m,

References